The Chronicles of Narnia is an American film series and media franchise based on The Chronicles of Narnia, a series of novels by C. S. Lewis. The series revolves around the adventures of children in the world of Narnia, guided by Aslan, a wise and powerful lion that can speak and is the true king of Narnia. The children heavily featured in the films are the Pevensie siblings, and a prominent antagonist is the White Witch (also known as Queen Jadis). The franchise also includes short films, digital series, and video games.

From the seven books, three were adapted—The Lion, the Witch and the Wardrobe (2005), Prince Caspian (2008), and The Voyage of the Dawn Treader (2010)—which collectively grossed over $1.5 billion worldwide. The first two films were directed by Andrew Adamson and the third film was directed by Michael Apted. A fourth film was to be directed by Joe Johnston, but it was announced in 2018 that new adaptations would be made for Netflix.  there have been no further updates on the status of the Netflix adaptations.

Development 
C. S. Lewis never sold the film rights to the Narnia series during his lifetime, as he was skeptical that any cinematic adaptation could render the more fantastical elements and characters of the story realistically.  Only after seeing a demo reel of CGI animals did Douglas Gresham (Lewis's stepson and literary executor, and film co-producer) give approval for a film adaptation.

Although the plan was originally to produce the films in the same order as the book series' original publication, it was reported that The Magician's Nephew, which recounts the creation of Narnia, would be the fourth feature film in the series, instead of The Silver Chair. It was rumoured that The Magician's Nephew was chosen as an attempt to reboot the series, after the release of The Voyage of the Dawn Treader grossed less when compared to the two previous films. In March 2011, Walden Media confirmed that they intended The Magician's Nephew to be next in the series, but stressed that it was not yet in development.

In October 2011, Douglas Gresham stated that Walden Media's contract with the C. S. Lewis estate had expired, hinting that Walden Media's lapse in renegotiating their contract with the C. S. Lewis estate was due to internal conflicts between both companies about the direction of future films.

On 1 October 2013, The C. S. Lewis Company announced a partnership with The Mark Gordon Company, and that The Chronicles of Narnia: The Silver Chair was officially in pre-production.

Films

The Chronicles of Narnia: The Lion, the Witch and the Wardrobe (2005) 

The Lion, the Witch and the Wardrobe, based on the 1950 novel of the same title, is the first film in the series. Directed by Andrew Adamson, it was shot mainly in New Zealand, though locations were used in Poland, the Czech Republic and the United Kingdom.

The story follows the four British Pevensie siblings, who are evacuated during the Blitz to the countryside, where they find a wardrobe that leads to the fantasy world of Narnia. There, they must ally with the lion Aslan against the forces of the White Witch, who has placed Narnia in an eternal winter.

The film was released theatrically on 9 December 2005 and on DVD on 4 April 2006 and grossed over $745 million worldwide.

The Chronicles of Narnia: Prince Caspian (2008) 

Prince Caspian, based on the 1951 novel of the same title, is the second film in the series and the last distributed by Walt Disney Pictures.

The story follows the same Pevensie children who were transported to Narnia in the previous film as they return to Narnia, where 1,300 years have passed and the land has been invaded by the Telmarines. The four Pevensie children aid Prince Caspian in his struggle for the throne against his corrupt uncle, King Miraz.

The film was released on 16 May 2008. It grossed $419 million worldwide.

The Chronicles of Narnia: The Voyage of the Dawn Treader (2010) 

The Voyage of the Dawn Treader, based on the 1952 novel of the same title, is the first film in the series not to be co-produced by Disney, who dropped out over a budget dispute with Walden Media. In January 2009, it was announced that Fox 2000 Pictures would replace Disney for future installments, although thanks to the acquisition of 21st Century Fox, Disney now owns the rights to all films,  Directed by Michael Apted, the movie was filmed almost entirely in Australia.

The story follows the two younger Pevensie children as they return to Narnia with their cousin, Eustace Scrubb. They join Caspian, now king of Narnia, in his quest to rescue seven lost lords and save Narnia from a corrupting evil that resides on a dark island.

The film was released on 10 December 2010 (in RealD 3D in select theatres) and grossed over $415 million worldwide.

Main cast

Children 
 William Moseley as Peter Pevensie, title: High King Peter the Magnificent, the eldest Pevensie child and the High King of Narnia during the Golden Age.
 Anna Popplewell as Susan Pevensie, title: Queen Susan the Gentle, the elder Pevensie child and a High Queen of Narnia during the Golden Age.
 Skandar Keynes as Edmund Pevensie, title: King Edmund the Just; the younger Pevensie child and a King of Narnia during the Golden Age.
 Georgie Henley as Lucy Pevensie, title: Queen Lucy the Valiant, the youngest Pevensie child and a Queen of Narnia during the Golden Age.
 Will Poulter as Eustace Scrubb, the Pevensie children's arrogant cousin.

Other main characters 
 Liam Neeson as the voice of Aslan, the magnificent and majestically powerful lion who helps govern and maintain order in Narnia; a mystical world of his own creation.
 Tilda Swinton as Jadis, the White Witch; the former queen of Charn and a witch who ruled Narnia during the events of The Lion, the Witch and the Wardrobe.
 Ben Barnes as Caspian X (Also known as "Prince Caspian"), the Telmarine prince who becomes King of Narnia after overthrowing his evil uncle Miraz.
 Eddie Izzard and Simon Pegg as the voice of Reepicheep in Prince Caspian and The Voyage of the Dawn Treader, respectively: the noble and courageous mouse who fights for Aslan and the freedom of Narnia.
 James McAvoy as Mr. Tumnus in The Lion, the Witch and the Wardrobe.
 Peter Dinklage as Trumpkin in Prince Caspian

Table of the main cast

Crew

Reception

Box office performance 
The series grossed over $1.5 billion worldwide, but critical and commercial reception diminished with each film.

Response

Future

The Silver Chair 
After Walden Media's contract of the series' film rights expired in 2011, The C. S. Lewis Company announced on 1 October 2013 that it had entered into an agreement with The Mark Gordon Company to produce an adaptation of the 1953 novel The Silver Chair. Mark Gordon and Douglas Gresham, along with Vincent Sieber, the Los Angeles based director of The C. S. Lewis Company, would serve as producers and work with The Mark Gordon Company on developing the script. On 5 December 2013, it was announced that David Magee would write the screenplay. In July 2014, the official Narnia website allowed the opportunity for fans to suggest names for the Lady of the Green Kirtle, the main antagonist. The winning name was to be selected by Mark Gordon and David Magee for use in the final script of The Silver Chair.

The film's producers have called the film a reboot in reference to the fact that the film has a new creative team not associated with those who worked on the previous three films. On 9 August 2016, it was announced that Sony's TriStar Productions and Entertainment One Films will finance and distribute the fourth film with The Mark Gordon Company (which eOne owns) and The C. S. Lewis Company. In April 2017, it was announced that Joe Johnston had been hired to direct The Silver Chair. During an interview with Red Carpet News TV, producer Mark Gordon revealed scarce details about the new technologies and setting that would be used for the upcoming film.

Possible Netflix reboot 
On 3 October 2018, it was announced that Netflix and the C. S. Lewis Company had made a multi-year agreement to develop a new series of film and TV adaptations of The Chronicles of Narnia. With this announcement, all previously announced plans for The Silver Chair were superseded.

Netflix has stated that its Chronicles of Narnia reboot is still moving forward. Mark Gordon is the primary producer on the project and has stated that there is potential to adapt the books into both a television series and potentially multiple feature films for the streaming service. On June 12, 2019, he hired Coco co-writer Matthew Aldrich to be the creative architect of the Netflix adaptation. Douglas Gresham, one of C.S. Lewis' two stepsons, commented in May 2020 that he was unsure about the future of the project as Netflix had not been in touch for a while, which may have been partly caused by the COVID-19 pandemic.

See also 
 Outline of Narnia
 The Chronicles of Narnia (1988–1990 TV series)
 The Lion, the Witch and the Wardrobe (1979 film)

References 
Footnotes

Citations

External links 

 
 
 

 
Film series introduced in 2005
British film series
British epic films
Walt Disney Studios (division) franchises
20th Century Studios franchises
Films about siblings
Fantasy film series
Adventure film series
Children's film series
Films about parallel universes
High fantasy films
Film series based on fantasy novels
American film series
American epic films